Balaganj is an upazila of Sylhet District in Sylhet Division,  Bangladesh.

Etymology
The name Balaganj is derived from the Bengali word bala meaning 'strength' and the Persian/Bengali word ganj that means 'marketplace'  or 'neighbourhood'. Its older name was Kushiyarakul named after the abundance of sugar-cane (kushiyar in Sylheti) in the area. The town also lies on the banks of the Kushiyara River, which also takes its name from sugarcane. An ashram was opened in its central bazaar known as the Madan Mohan Jiu Ashram, which renamed the area to Madanganj. The female worshippers at the temple were known for wearing many bangles on both of their hands. The popularity of bangles in the area increased so much that the town eventually became known as Balaganj Bazaar.

History

After the Conquest of Gour in 1303, many disciples of Shah Jalal migrated to modern-day Balaganj (Gauharpur Pargana) where they preached Islam to the local people such as Aziz Chishti. Shah Alauddin went to Alapur, Shah Kala Miah Irani went to Shiyorkhal and Shah Sultan went to what is now Sultanpur.

Balaganj thana was established in 1882 and included present-day Osmani Nagar, Fenchuganj and Rajnagar. It separated from Fenchuganj and Rajnagar by 10 January 1922. Balaganj was the scene of the battles at Sherpur and Sadipur during the Bangladesh Liberation War in 1971. The Adityapur massacre on 6 May 1971 and Galimpur massacre against Bengali Hindus took place in this upazila. The war dead are buried in mass graves at Adityapur and Bhatpara Salimpur.

It is the third largest upazila of Sylhet district by population. It was turned into an upazila on 7 November 1982. It consists of 14 union parishads, 241 mouzas and 467 villages.

Geography
Balaganj stands on the Kushiyara River and is on the southwest periphery of Sylhet district. To the north is Sylhet Sadar Upazila, to the south are Rajnagar Upazila and Moulvibazar Sadar Upazila in Moulvibazar District, Fenchuganj Upazila of this district is on the east and on the west is Bishwanath Upazila of this district and Jagannathpur Upazila of Sunamganj District. Geographically Balaganj Upazila is situated at about 24.36* and 24.47* longitude and 91.38* and 91.56* east latitude. The distance of the Upazila headquarter(HQ) from the district HQ is nearly 37 km. The land area is approximately 375.92 km2

It has 36,919 household units and occupies an area of 389.51 km2. The upazila is bordered on the north by Sylhet Sadar and Bishwanath Upazilas, on the east by Fenchuganj Upazila, on the South by Maulvibazar Sadar Upazila and Rajnagar Upazila of Maulvibazar district, and on the west by Jagannathpur Upazila of Sunamganj district and Nabiganj Upazila of Habiganj district.

Demographics
As of the 1991 Bangladesh census, Balaganj has a population of 230,865. Males constitute 50.67% of the population, and females 49.33%. Muslim 90.04%, Hindu 9.89%, Buddhist, Christian and others 0.07%. This Upazila's eighteen and over population is 115,624. Balaganj has an average literacy rate of 57.4% (7+ years), with the national average being 32.4%. The population is 3,20,227. (Census-2001).

Economy
Main hats, bazars and fairs Balaganj, Moyna Bazar, Goala Bazar, Tajpur Bazar, Doyamir Bazar, Pirer Bazar, Bualjur Bazar, Ilashpur Bazar, Azizpur Bazar, Goherpur Bazar/Murar Bazar, Madrasa Bazar, Bangla Bazar, Khaler Mukh Hats and Shior Khal Mela are notable.

Main occupations Agriculture 26.04%, service 24.51%, commerce 18.22%, agricultural labourer 11.31%, wage labourer 7.25%, fishing 4.29%, transport 1.97%, others 6.41%

Administration
Balaganj Upazila is divided into 14 union parishads: Balaganj, Boaljur Bazar, Burunga, Dayamir, Dewan Bazar, Goula Bazar, Omarpur, Osmanpur, Paschim Gauripur, Paschim Pailanpur, Purba Gauripur, Purba Pailanpur, Saidpur, and Tajpur. The union parishads are subdivided into 239 mauzas and 473 villages.

Education
Educational institutions: 11 colleges, 57 secondary schools, 278 primary schools, 44 madrasas.
 Islamia Mohammadiya Alim Madrasha 
 Balaganj Degree College
 Islamia Mohammadiya Alim Madrasha 
 Balaganj D.N. High School, D.N. High School

Notable residents
Aziz Chishti
Enamul Haque Chowdhury
Islah Abdur-Rahman
Iqbal Ahmed
Lutfur Rahman
Nur Uddin Gohorpuri

See also
 Upazilas of Bangladesh
 Districts of Bangladesh
 Divisions of Bangladesh

References